Events from the year 1944 in art.

Events
 June 6 – Normandy landings: Robert Capa takes "The Magnificent Eleven" photographs.
 July – Dulwich Picture Gallery in London is substantially damaged by a V-1 flying bomb; half a dozen paintings are destroyed, but most have been evacuated to Aberystwyth.
 Autumn – Peggy Guggenheim's The Art of This Century gallery on Manhattan releases a 78 rpm 3-record album containing Paul Bowles' Sonata for Flute and Piano and Two Mexican Dances with a cover by Max Ernst.
 Clandestine publication of Vaincre, an album of 12 colour lithographs by 8 artists in support of the French Resistance.

Awards
 Archibald Prize: Joshua Smith – Hon Sol Rosevear, MHR, Speaker of the House of Representatives

Exhibitions
 Jean Dubuffet's first solo exhibition.

Works

 David Aronson – The Last Supper
 Duffy Ayers – Portrait of Tirzah Garwood
 Francis Bacon – Three Studies for Figures at the Base of a Crucifixion
 David Bomberg – Evening in the City of London
 Stella Bowen – Bomber Crew
 Robert Capa – "The Magnificent Eleven" (photographs)
 William Coldstream – Casualty Reception Station, Capua
 Salvador Dalí –
 Dream Caused by the Flight of a Bee Around a Pomegranate a Second Before Awakening
 Tristan and Isolde created for the ballet Mad Tristan by Leonide Massine and Dali which in turn was inspired by the opera Tristan und Isolde by Richard Wagner
 Paul Delvaux – Sleeping Venus
 Jacob Epstein – sculptures
 First Portrait of Esther (with long hair)
 Lucifer
 George Grosz – Cain, or Hitler in Hell
 Jean Hélion – The Stairway
 Bror Hjorth – Gås-Anders (sculpture)
 Frida Kahlo
 The Broken Column
 Diego and Frida 1929-1944
 Dame Laura Knight – Take Off
 Fernand Léger – Three Musicians (Museum of Modern Art, New York)
 Henri Matisse – Annelies, White Tulips and Anemones
 Joan Miró – Barcelona Series (lithographs)
 Piet Mondrian (died February 1) – Victory Boogie-Woogie (unfinished)
 Walter Thomas Monnington
 Southern England: Spitfires  Attacking Flying-bombs
 Tempests Attacking Flying-bombs
 Felix Nussbaum – Triumph of Death
 Pablo Picasso – Man with Sheep (sculpture)
 William Roberts
 The Ballet
 The Ferry (at Marston near Oxford)
 Parson's Pleasure (On the Lawn)
 Robert F. Sargent – Into the Jaws of Death (photograph)
 Ben Shahn – The Red Stairway

Births
 9 January – Ian Hornak, American painter and draughtsman (d. 2002).
 10 January – Jeff Jones, American illustrator.
 12 February - Jane Livingston, American curator.
 4 March – Glen Baxter, English cartoonist.
 29 March – Abbas, Iranian-born documentary photographer (d. 2018).
 4 April – Phyllida Barlow, English sculptor (d. 2023).
 8 May – David Vaughan, English psychedelic artist and muralist (d. 2003).
 4 August – Allan McCollum, American conceptual artist, all media.
 15 August – Gianfranco Ferré, Italian fashion designer (d. 2007).
 20 August – Brian Barnes, English mural artist.
 27 August – Catherine Leroy, French-born photographer (d. 2006).
 1 September – Louis Delsarte, American painter.
 4 November – Don Eddy, American painter.
 23 November – Peter Lindbergh, born Peter Brodbeck, Polish-born fashion photographer (d. 2019).

Full date unknown
 Michael Heizer, American sculptor, earth artist.
 Richard Mock, American painter, sculptor and cartoonist (d. 2006).
 Allen Ruppersberg, American conceptual artist, installation artist.

Deaths
 January 23 – Edvard Munch, Norwegian expressionist painter (b. 1863)
 February 1 – Piet Mondrian, Dutch abstract painter (b. 1872)
 February 26 – Lucienne Heuvelmans, French sculptor (b. 1885?)
 April 25 – George Herriman, American cartoonist (Krazy Kat) (b. 1880)
 July 18 – Rex Whistler, English painter (killed in action) (b. 1905)
 August 2 – Felix Nussbaum, German Jewish surrealist painter (in Auschwitz concentration camp) (b. 1904)
 August 18 – Hans Mertens, German painter (b. 1906)
 September 3 – William Logsdail, English landscape, portrait and genre painter (b. 1859)
 September 27
 Aristide Maillol, French sculptor (b. 1861)
 Sergey Prokudin-Gorsky, Russian-born color photographer (b. 1863)
 David Dougal Williams, British painter (b. 1888)
 October 14 – Marko Murat, Serbian painter (b. 1864)
 October 21 – Hilma af Klint, Swedish abstract painter and mystic (b. 1862)
 November 22 – Sir George Clausen, English artist (b. 1852)
 December 10 – Miklós Ligeti, Hungarian sculptor (b. 1871)
 December 13 – Wassily Kandinsky, Russian abstract painter (b. 1866)
 December 24 – Alfred Drury, English sculptor (b. 1856)
 Undated – Esther Kenworthy Waterhouse, English flower painter (b. 1857)

See also
 1944 in fine arts of the Soviet Union

References

 
Years of the 20th century in art
1940s in art